Aminu is a Hausa language name.  It is a variation of "Amin", an Arabic name. Aminu means trustworthy. Amin means true-hearted, honest. People who share this name include:

Given name
Aminu Sule Garo (born 1962), Nigerian politician and businessman
Aminu Kano (1920—1983), Nigerian politician
Aminu Isa Kontagora, Nigerian military Administrator and governor
Aminu Mohammed (born 1993), Ghanaian footballer
Aminu Mohammed (basketball) (born 2001), Nigerian basketball player
Aminu Safana (1961–2007), Nigerian politician
Aminu Saleh, Nigerian administrator, former Finance Minister, and permanent secretary in the Nigerian ministry of Defense
Aminu Sani (born 1980), Nigerian footballer who plays midfielder
Aminu Waziri Tambuwal (born 1966), Governor of Sokoto State since 2015
Aminu Bello Masari (born 1950), Governor of Katsina State since 2015

Surname
Abdulkareem Baba Aminu (born 1977), Nigerian journalist and artist
Abdulmumini Aminu (born 1949), Nigerian politician best known as military governor of Borno State, Nigeria between August 1985 and December 1987
Al-Farouq Aminu (born 1990), American-Nigerian basketball player, brother of Alade Aminu
Alade Aminu (born 1987), American-Nigerian basketball player, brother of Al-Farouq Aminu, 2015–16 Israel Basketball Premier League rebounding leader
Jubril Aminu (born 1939), Nigerian professor and politician
Rachael 'rae' Aminu  (born 1987), Nigerian-American 
lawyer, author , and music minister
Mohammed Aminu

See also
Mallam Aminu Kano International Airport, an airport in Kano, Kano State, Nigeria